The Mixed duet technical routine competition of the synchronised swimming events at the 2015 World Aquatics Championships was held on 25 and 26 July 2015.

Results
The preliminary round was held on 25 July at 11:45. The final was held on 26 July at 19:15.

Green denotes finalists

References

Mixed duet technical routine
World Aquatics Championships